James Bourchier Metro Station is a station on the Sofia Metro in Bulgaria, named after James David Bourchier. It opened on 31 August 2012. Bulgaria's PM Boyko Borisov and the President of the European Commission Jose Manuel Barroso inaugurated the new section of the Sofia Metro, which was funded with EU money. The initial project name of the Metro Station  was Lozenets named after the neighbourhood Lozenets.

A park-and-ride underground facility with 650 parking lots was built along with the construction of the James Bourchier Station.

Interchange with other public transport
 Tramway service: 10
 Suburban Bus service: 98

Location

Gallery

References

External links

 Sofia Metropolitan
 More info in Bulgarian
 SofiaMetro@UrbanRail
 Sofia Urban Mobility Center
 Sofia Metropolitan 

Sofia Metro stations
Railway stations opened in 2012
2012 establishments in Bulgaria